Dr. Hideki "Kit" Miyamoto (born 1963) is a Japanese American structural engineer known for being the founder-CEO of Miyamoto International, a global structural engineering and disaster risk reduction organization. He is also the chairman of California's Alfred E. Alquist Seismic Safety Commission, which investigates earthquakes and recommends policies for risk reduction.

Early life and education
Miyamoto was born and raised in Tokyo and studied earthquake engineering from the Tokyo Institute of Technology and California State University. He lives in Los Angeles.

Career
Miyamoto started his career in structural engineering and later focused on disaster resiliency, response and reconstruction. He provides policy consultation to the World Bank, USAID, UN agencies, governments and private sector. He has led teams of professionals on response and reconstruction projects after the 2008 Sichuan earthquake, 2010 Haiti earthquake, 2011 Japan earthquake, 2015 Nepal earthquake, 2020 Puerto Rico earthquakes and other seismic risk reduction programs along with disaster risk mitigation policy work.

Miyamoto was elected as a chair of the California Seismic Safety Commission in October 2020. He has formerly served as a seismic safety commissioner for eight years where he has advocated for increased resiliency in California.

Innovations
Dr. Miyamoto was responsible for the seismic retrofit of the Theme Building, an iconic Space Age structure at Los Angeles International Airport (LAX). The innovative retrofit consisted of adding a tuned mass damper (TMD) to the top of the building’s core. The TMD option was selected because it was less expensive, protected the building’s architectural features, and minimized building closure. This was the first time this retrofit had been achieved in the United States.

Earthquakes & Natural Disasters
Afghanistan Earthquake 2022

The 6.0 magnitude earthquake that struck Afghanistan in the summer of 2022 caused significant damage to the region. In response, Miyamoto, a renowned disaster relief expert, and his team partnered with the International Organization for Migration (IOM) to assess the damage and begin rebuilding efforts for the 14,000 affected families. Through their collaborative efforts, they have been working tirelessly to repair and rebuild homes in the affected area, providing much-needed support to those affected by the disaster.

Miyamoto and his team utilized the ArcGIS platform to collect data in real-time and understand the full scope of the repair and reconstruction work needed.

Miyamoto and his team found the importance of repairing traditional and vernacular architecture, as this approach allows for the use of locally available materials and labor, which can repair 50% of the buildings quickly and cost-effectively, improving the living conditions of 50,000 people. Additionally, Miyamoto has noted the significance of preserving the compounds, and clusters of buildings where families and cultural systems are located and has outlined plans to repair any damage to them.

2022 Ukraine Invasion and Reconstruction

In an effort to bring innovation, know-how, and scalability to complex recovery and reconstruction projects, Miyamoto and his team have been heavily involved in the assessment and repair of damages caused by the Russian invasion of Ukraine, which to date, has resulted in the destruction of over 150,000 housing and apartments units in liberated areas. In addition to critical infrastructure, the Russian military targeted schools, hospitals, shopping centers, and factories. Miyamoto and his team are working with UN agencies to repair damaged this damaged infrastructure, with a focus on using locally available materials and labor. Their goal is to improve the living conditions of those affected by the conflict and help the people of Ukraine return to normality.

In addition, Dr. Miyamoto paved the way to opening a new Miyamoto International location in Kyiv, Ukraine in 2022. The Ukraine office is currently led by principal Pavlo Pokhalchuk and features a team of expert engineers,

2010 and 2021 Haiti Earthquakes

In 2010, an earthquake struck Haiti, causing widespread devastation and prompting an international response. Miyamoto International, a global disaster engineering and reconstruction firm, was among the organizations that provided assistance in the aftermath of the disaster. Led by CEO Dr. Kit Miyamoto, the company conducted damage assessments of 420,000 structures in Port-au-Prince and developed a reconstruction strategy for the affected area. In addition to working with the government of Haiti and key recovery stakeholders, Dr. Kit Miyamoto and Miyamoto International also partnered with the United Nations Office of Project Services (UNOPS), World Bank, and United States Agency for International Development (USAID) on the recovery efforts.Over the years and in partnership with various organizations, Miyamoto organized numerous training programs to teach resilient construction methods to engineers, masons, and homeowners across Haiti.

In November 2020, Miyamoto assessed masons randomly selected throughout Port-au-Prince. These masons had not been previously trained by Miyamoto and weren’t involved in the 2010 earthquake response. Over 80% passed the assessments and put earthquake-resistant masonry techniques into practice in their own work.
Dr. Miyamoto has also provided assistance in Haiti following the 2021 earthquake in the country. Along with a local team of earthquake structural engineering experts, he has conducted damage assessments of villages and critical infrastructure, such as water, power, and communications, in remote, rugged areas. To support the rebuilding efforts, Dr. Miyamoto also established Miyamoto Relief, a 501(c)(3) non-profit organization that accepts donations to help the people of Haiti get back on their feet. The organization states that 100% of the donations go towards the people in need, with no overhead.

Awards & Recognition

Publications
 Seismic Risk Assessment and Retrofit of School Buildings In Developing Countries Los Angeles, California, 2018.
 Seismic Collapse Probability of Structures with Viscous Dampers per ASCE 7-16: Effect of Large Earthquake Los Angeles, California, 2018.
 Damage Assessment and Seismic Retrofit of Heritage and Modern Buildings in the Aftermath of 2015 Nepal Earthquake Los Angeles, California, 2018.
 Design of Structures with Dampers per ASCE 7-16 and Performance for Large Earthquakes Houston, Texas, 2018.
 Cost-Effective Seismic Isolation Retrofit of Heritage Cathedrals in Haiti Santiago, Chile, 2017.
 Transparent Global Earthquake Risk And Loss Estimation Tokyo, Japan, 2013.

Professional Affiliations
 Seismic Risk Assessment and Retrofit of School Buildings In Developing Countries
 Professional Affiliations
 California Seismic Safety Commissioner
 World Trade Center, Northern California Director
 Global Earthquake Model, Board Member
 Haiti Renewal Alliance, Board Member
 American Society of Civil Engineers (ASCE), Fellow
 Institution of Professional Engineers New Zealand (MIPENZ)
 Structural Engineers Association of California (SEAOC), Past Director
 City of Sacramento, Past Design Commissioner
 California State University, Sacramento, Adjunct Professor for Earthquake Engineering
 ASCE 7, Seismic Task Committee
 Applied Technology Council, Chair
 US-Japan Workshop, Building Seismic Safety Council, Provisions Update Committee
 Earthquake Engineering Research Institute (EERI)
 American Concrete Institute (ACI)
 American Institute of Steel Construction (AISC)
 American Institute of Architects, Central Valley (AIACV), Past Allied Board Member
 Sacramento Asian Pacific Chamber of Commerce
 Geo Hazard International (GHI)
 Post-Tension Institute (PTI)

Media
Major media such as CNN, LA Times, NY Times and Rolling Stone have mentioned, represented, or interviewed him. He was also featured in the “Designing for Disaster” exhibit at the National Building Museum.

References 

Structural engineers
Earthquake engineering
1963 births
Living people